Fort Selkirk Aerodrome  is an aerodrome located Fort Selkirk, Yukon, Canada.

References 

Registered aerodromes in Yukon